DDW, The Color House (D.D. Williamson) is a global, privately held corporation providing caramel color, burnt sugar & natural colorings for the food and beverage industry. In 1865, Dutch immigrant Douw Ditmars Williamson founded D.D. Williamson in New York to manufacture burnt sugars for the brewing industry. The caramel industry moved into coloring cola and many other foods following Prohibition and the Great Depression.

Now headquartered in Louisville, Kentucky, DDW has nine manufacturing sites for naturally derived coloring on five continents with customers in 100 countries. DDW's first international manufacturing facility was founded in Little Island, Cork.

The company is an emerging leader for natural coloring in yellow, orange and brown hues. Every day more than 2 billion servings of food and beverages containing DDW coloring are consumed around the globe.

References

Food and drink companies of the United States
Manufacturing companies based in Louisville, Kentucky
1865 establishments in New York (state)
Food and drink companies established in 1865
American companies established in 1865